A bagel is a ring-shaped roll of yeasted wheat dipped in hot water prior to baking.

Bagel or bagels may also refer to:

 Hydyne, unofficial whimsical name 'Bagel'
 Bagel, winning any game by shutout
 Bagel (tennis), to win a set 6–0 in tennis
 Bagel (pickleball), to win a game 11-0
 "Bagels", an episode of the television series Teletubbies
 Bagel, a slang term among South African Jews for an overly materialistic and excessively groomed young man

See also
 Bagels & Yox, a 1951 comedy/variety theater revue; see Central Theatre (New York City)
 Bagle (computer worm), a mass-mailing computer worm